Pocahontas: The Legend is a 1995 drama film that fictionalizes the young life of the historical figure of Chief Powhatan's daughter Pocahontas and her relationship with Captain John Smith. This film was directed by Danièle J. Suissa and stars Sandrine Holt as the titular heroine. It was entirely shot around Toronto and Six Nations of the Grand River in Ontario, Canada.

This is the third live-action feature film based on the life of Pocahontas and John Smith, the others being Pocahontas and John Smith (1924) and Captain John Smith and Pocahontas (1953). John Rolfe, the second husband of Pocahontas, does not appear in this motion picture.

Two actors in this film have been involved in other Pocahontas-related projects. Gordon Tootoosis previously voiced Kekata the shaman in Disney's 1995 animated film. Billy Merasty, who acted as Kocoum, would ten years later portray a Kiskiack in The New World.

Cast
 Sandrine Holt as Pocahontas (Matoaka)
 Miles O'Keeffe as Captain John Smith
 Tony Goldwyn as Sir Edwin Wingfield
 Gordon Tootoosis as Chief Powhatan (Wahunsonacock)
 Billy Merasty as Kocoum
 George Buza as Jules
 Mark J. Richardson as Jeremy
 David Hemblen as Christopher Newport
 Billy Two Rivers as Mochiqus
 Bucky Hill as Japazaws
 Kennetch Charlette as Opachisco
 Michael Stevens as Newport's Guard

External links

1995 films
Films about Native Americans
Canadian biographical drama films
English-language Canadian films
Films set in the 1600s
Films set in Virginia
Films set in the Powhatan Confederacy
Films set in the Thirteen Colonies
Films shot in Ontario
1990s biographical drama films
Cultural depictions of Pocahontas
1995 drama films
1990s English-language films
1990s Canadian films